Madoka Sugai (菅井円加, Sugai Madoka, born 1994) is a Japanese ballet dancer who is currently a principal dancer with the Hamburg Ballet.

Early life
Sugai was born in Atsugi, Kanagawa Prefecture. She trained at Sasaki Mika Ballet Academy in Yamato, Kanagawa.

Career
In 2012, Sugai won the Prix de Lausanne in Switzerland, for which Miyako Yoshida was a juror. After her victory, she was offered an apprenticeship to The Hamburg Ballet's second company, National Youth Ballet, and joined the main company in 2014. In 2016, she danced a pax de deux from Flower Festival in Genzano with colleague Christopher Evans at the Erik Bruhn Prize. She became a soloist in the following year and principal dancer in 2019. Her repertoire includes works by John Neumeier, Rudolf Nureyev and Jerome Robbins, and she originated a role in Neumeier's Beethoven Project.

Selected repertoire
Sugai's repertoire with the Hamburg Ballet includes:

References

External links
Sugai at the Prix de Lausanne
Sugai in Don Quixote

Japanese ballerinas
Living people
1994 births
21st-century ballet dancers
Japanese expatriates in Germany
Prima ballerinas
People from Atsugi, Kanagawa
Prix de Lausanne winners